Janawada is a town located  away from Bidar city of Indian state of Karnataka. It is famous For Sikh Gurudwara Temple.

Demographics
 India census, Janwada had a population of 6031 with 3062 males and 2969 females.

See also
 Bidar
 Districts of Karnataka

References

External links
 http://Bidar.nic.in/

Villages in Bidar district